"How Long" is a song by American singer-songwriter J. D. Souther. Written in 1971 it was originally recorded by Souther for his 1972 debut solo album, John David Souther. It was given a limited release as a promotional 7-inch 45 rpm single in 1972 with Souther's "The Fast One" on the B-side.

The Eagles, longtime friends and collaborators with Souther, frequently performed "How Long" in concert during the early and mid-1970s. In 2007, the band covered the song for their album Long Road Out of Eden, the group's first full studio album since 1979. A year later, their version of the song won the Grammy Award for Best Country Performance by a Duo or Group with Vocal. It was the band's first Grammy since 1979.

Peak positions

Weekly charts

Year-end charts

References

External links
  

1972 songs
2007 singles
Eagles (band) songs
J. D. Souther songs
Songs written by J. D. Souther
Lost Highway Records singles
Song recordings produced by Bill Szymczyk